Ghetto Postage is the ninth studio album by American rapper Master P.  It was released in November 28, 2000 on No Limit Records and Priority Records in the United States. This is Master P's last album to be distributed by Priority. The album features Snoop Dogg, Silkk the Shocker and Tamar Braxton. The album included the singles "Bout Dat" featuring Silkk the Shocker and "Souljas". The album was mostly produced by Carlos Stephens and Donald XL Robertson along with Myke Diesel.

Critical reception

Ghetto Postage garnered mixed reviews from music critics, who were divided over the production and Master P's musical performance. At Metacritic, which assigns a normalized rating out of 100 to reviews from mainstream critics, the album received an average score of 57, based on 6 reviews.

Steve 'Flash' Juon of RapReviews gave note of the album's in-house production providing catchy bangers, sparse list of guest artists and Master P adopting different personas and limiting his "guttural moan of ghetto pain" on each track, concluding that "P sticks to themes and with 19 songs on the album, he has more than enough chance to get hot; he catches that heat on more than half. It's not a risky or an innovative album, but the fans of the Tank will keep rollin." AllMusic's Jason Birchmeier felt the record had an overlong track listing with many duds but found it much better than Only God Can Judge Me, giving praise to "Bout Dat", "I Don't Give Ah What" and "Souljas" as highlights and the framing of Master P in a more likable role, concluding that "[T]his doesn't necessarily make for good music, but it's one of the album's nicer qualities." Evan Serpick of Entertainment Weekly called the album an "overwrought gangsta package" for containing "stale rhymes and grooves", a lengthy hip-hop checklist, and all too brief bursts of humor to give the listeners relief from Master P's litany of lyrical assaults against former labelmates. A writer for HipHopDX criticized the record's production team for creating underwhelming beats that lack the punch found in Ghetto D and Master P's performance feeling uninspired and only there for both the gimmicky title and name value, concluding that, "Although some fans will surely enjoy Master P's newest it seems more likely that Ghetto Postage will only cause his fanbase to dwindle even further than it already has. He must be kicking himself at about this time, if only he hadn't dumped his old producers."

Commercial performance
The album found decent success with the single "Bout Dat" featuring Silkk The Shocker, which made it to number eleven on the US Hot R&B/Hip Hop Singles & Tracks.

Animation
The music video for "Souljas" was the first fully animated Hip Hop music video ever which became a huge success for No Limit.

Track listing

Charts

Album

Weekly charts

Year-end charts

Singles
Bout Dat

Souljas

Certifications

External links
 Official track listing

References

Master P albums
2000 albums
Albums produced by Fredwreck
No Limit Records albums